Kerivoula is a genus of vesper bats in the subfamily Kerivoulinae. They are found throughout tropical and subtropical regions of Africa, Asia, and New Guinea.

Species within this genus are:

Tanzanian woolly bat (Kerivoula africana)
St. Aignan's trumpet-eared bat (Kerivoula agnella)
Damara woolly bat (Kerivoula argentata)
Cryptic woolly bat, Kerivoula crypta
Copper woolly bat (Kerivoula cuprosa)
Flat-skulled woolly bat, Kerivoula depressa
Indochinese woolly bat, Kerivoula dongduongana
Ethiopian woolly bat (Kerivoula eriophora)
Flores woolly bat (Kerivoula flora)
Dark woolly bat (Kerivoula furva)
Hardwicke's woolly bat (Kerivoula hardwickii)
Small woolly bat (Kerivoula intermedia)
Kachin woolly bat (Kerivoula kachinensis)
Krau woolly bat (Kerivoula krauensis)
Lesser woolly bat (Kerivoula lanosa)
Lenis woolly bat (Kerivoula lenis)
Sri Lankan woolly bat (Kerivoula malpasi)
Least woolly bat (Kerivoula minuta)
Fly River trumpet-eared bat (Kerivoula muscina)
Bismarck's trumpet-eared bat (Kerivoula myrella)
Papillose woolly bat (Kerivoula papillosa)
Clear-winged woolly bat (Kerivoula pellucida)
Spurrell's woolly bat (Kerivoula phalaena)
Painted bat (Kerivoula picta)
Bornean woolly bat (K. pusilla)
Smith's woolly bat (Kerivoula smithii)
Titania's woolly bat (Kerivoula titania)
Whitehead's woolly bat (Kerivoula whiteheadi)

References

Kerivoulinae
Bat genera
Taxa named by John Edward Gray